Mademoiselle (abbreviated as Mlle or M) may refer to:

 Mademoiselle (title), the French-language equivalent of the title "miss"

Film and television
 Mademoiselle (1966 film), a French-British drama directed by Tony Richardson
 Mademoiselle (2001 film), a French comedy directed by Philippe Lioret
 Mlle (TV channel), now MOI ET CIE, a Canadian French-language channel

Music
 "Mademoiselle" (song), by Styx, 1976
 "Mademoiselle", a song by Murray Head from Between Us, 1979
 "Mademoiselle", a song by Eddy Howard, 1952

Other uses
 Mademoiselle, a typeface designed by Tommy Thompson
 Mademoiselle (magazine), a defunct American women's magazine

See also

Damsel (disambiguation)
Demoiselle (disambiguation)
Fräulein, a similar German term